Dwars may refer to:

The Duars or Dooars, the fertile flood plains of the River Brahmaputra in the Indian states of Assam and West Bengal, and part of Bhutan
DWARS, the youth wing of the GreenLeft, a Dutch green political party

de:Liste seemännischer Fachwörter (A bis M)#D